John Geoffrey Pugh (22 January 1904 – 14 February 1964) was an English cricketer. Pugh was a right-handed batsman who bowled right-arm medium pace. He was born at Coventry, Warwickshire, and was educated at Rugby School.

Pugh made his first-class debut for Warwickshire against Northamptonshire at Edgbaston in the 1922 County Championship. He made eight further first-class appearances for the county, the last of which came against Surrey in the 1927 County Championship. In his nine first-class matches, he scored a total of 82 runs at an average of 9.11, with a high score of 41. With the ball, he took 6 wickets at a bowling average of 34.33, with best figures of 4/100.

He died at Hastings, Barbados, on 14 February 1964. His nephew, Tom Pugh, also played first-class cricket.

References

External links
John Pugh at ESPNcricinfo
John Pugh at CricketArchive

1904 births
1964 deaths
Cricketers from Coventry
People educated at Rugby School
English cricketers
Warwickshire cricketers